The Innovationspreis des Beauftragten für Kultur und Medien (Innovation in Culture and Media Prize) was a German government media award which granted prizes of 15 to 25,000 Euros yearly from 2002 to 2010 to individuals or institutions in the film industry that demonstrated innovation.

Past winners

References

External links 
 Innovationspreis des Beauftragten für Kultur und Medien

German film awards